Ever Night is a 2018 Chinese television series based on the novel Jiang Ye by Mao Ni. It stars Chen Feiyu and Song Yiren. The series streamed on Tencent Video beginning October 31, 2018. The second season premiered on January 13, 2020, as Ever Night: War of Brilliant Splendours, with Dylan Wang replaced Chen Feiyu as the lead star.

Synopsis
In the ancient world lies a prophecy: Upon the arrival of Yong Ye, the world will be thrown into Chaos.
The story takes place in the Tang dynasty. When a family was unjustly massacred by a great general, only a young boy named Ning Que escapes. He manages to survive in the wilds through his wits and by defending the border of Tang and Yan as a soldier of sorts. One day, he digs a little girl he named Sang Sang, because of a mulberry shaped leaf birthmark on her foot (Sang sang means mulberry) out of a pile of corpses. Since that day, the two of them are inseparable. Ning Que joins the frontier military and eventually becomes part of the entourage of Princess Li Yu as she travels back to the capital. He manages to join the most prestigious academy in Tang where he discovers a hidden school within Tang Academy known as the Second Story. Members of this hidden school are invited disciples of Confucius (Fu Zi). He becomes the 13th disciple as well as the school’s ambassador. Becoming a disciple of Fu Zi leads him and Sang Sang to many wondrous and near death adventures.

When Sang Sang becomes ill with a mysterious illness, Ning Que takes her to a doctor, only to discover that Sang Sang is the reincarnation of Yong Ye (Eternal Night), a mysterious and powerful being that is prophesied to bring chaos. Many hostile forces are gathering around them, and people not who they appeared to be. Is Ning Que the son of the King of Underworld, or the savior of humanity against the Eternal Night? Ning Que would defy the powers of Heaven and Earth to protect his beloved.

Cast

Tang Empire State
Strongest Empire of the South. Home of the Great Cultivators and Warriors.

Tang Academy
Top Academy of the Country. Home to the mysterious and powerful Cultivators.

Tang kingdom

Yan kingdom
Archnemesis of Tang Empire.

Xiling Immortal Shrine
Home of the Dao Cultivists that overpowered the Continent. They strictly follow the law of Hao Tian. Home of Heaven Decree Academy, the arch-nemesis of Fu Zi Academy.

Sect Masters (Wayfarers)

Others

Production
The script for Ever Night was once awarded the Gold Prize at the 网络文学双年奖, and reportedly took two years to complete. Penning the script is Xu Run, who once wrote the screenplay for notable television series like Records of Kangxi's Travel Incognito and Maritime Silk Road.
The production team has also invited Yoshitaka Amano to act as the series' concept director, and John Bruno as the special effects director.

The series began filming at Xinjiang in August 2017, and wrapped up filming in February 2018. Filming took place in Xinjiang and Guizhou.

Soundtrack

Awards and nominations

References

External links
 

Television series by Tencent Pictures
Chinese fantasy television series
2018 Chinese television series debuts
Television shows based on Chinese novels
2018 web series debuts
Chinese web series
Tencent original programming